The Colonial School (also known colloquially as ) was a French public higher education institution or grande école, created in Paris in 1889 to provide training for public servants and administrators of the French colonial empire. It also was a center for research in geography, anthropology, ethnology and other scientific endeavors with a focus on French-administered territories.

As France's overseas possessions changed and shrank, the school was restructured and renamed on several occasions: in 1934 as École nationale de la France d'outre-mer (ENFOM, "National School of Overseas France"), in 1959 as Institut des hautes études d'Outre-Mer (IHEOM, "Institute of Higher Overseas Studies"), and in 1966 as Institut international d’administration publique (IIAP, "International Institute of Public Administration"). It had students from both Metropolitan France and its overseas possessions and colonies. Its latest incarnation, the IIAP, was sometimes referred to as "the foreigners' ENA" with reference to France's École nationale d'administration, and was eventually merged into ENA in 2002.

Background

This was succeeded in 1889 by the Colonial School as a fully-fledged establishment for the professional education of colonial services staff. Its creation, supported by State Councillor , was the first successful effort to create a permanent establishment specifically for the training of French civil servants, thus prefiguring both ENA and the French National School for the Judiciary.

African students were admitted from 1892 alongside the Cambodian class, and soon later, students from Metropolitan France as well.

In 1927,  were created at both Lycée Louis-le-Grand and Lycée Henri-IV to prepare future students of the Colonial School, and the latter's training was made free of charge in 1931.

Building

The school's building in Paris, on 2 avenue de l'Observatoire near the Jardin du Luxembourg, was designed by architect  and built from 1895 to 1911. The Colonial School moved there in 1896 after having been located during its first few years on rue Jacob.

It is a prime exemplar of French colonial Moorish Revival architecture, with inspiration principally from Moroccan architecture, and used to be known colloquially as the "old mosque" since it predated the Grand Mosque of Paris, built in a similar style.

The building was successively the seat of ENFOM, IHEOM, and IIAP including after the latter's absorption by ENA in 2002. Some of the building's decoration evoking colonial glories was deemed inappropriate and removed in the 1970s.

In 2007, Sciences Po acquired ENA's Parisian campus on the rue de l'Université, and ENA made the Colonial School building its sole Parisian location at the end of that year. On , ENA was in turn replaced by the Institut national du service public, which kept the Colonial School building as its Paris campus.

Leadership

Directors 
 1889–1905: Etienne Aymonier
 1905-1917: Maurice Doubrère
 1918-1926: Max Outrey
 1926-1933: Georges Hardy
 1933-1937: Henri Gourdon
 1937–1946: Robert Delavignette
 1946-1950: Paul Mus
 1950-1959: Paul Bouteille 
 1959–1964: François Luchaire
 1965-1974: Jean Baillou
 1974-1982: Henri Roson
 1982-1985: Gaston Olive
 1985-1993: Jean-Pierre Puissochet
 1993: Michel Franc
 1993-2001: Didier Maus

Selected faculty

 Hubert Lyautey
 Jules Brévié
 Pierre Moussa
 Louis Vignon
 Charles-André Julien
 Henri Brunschwig
 Léopold Sédar Senghor

Selected alumni
 Max Jacob (1876-1944), French poet
 Félix Éboué (1884-1944), colonial administrator 
 Sisavang Vong (1885-1959), King of Luang Prabang and of Laos
 Phetsarath Rattanavongsa (1890-1959), Prime Minister of Laos
 Raymond Dronne (1908-1991), French resistance fighter 
 Pierre Messmer (1916-2007), French Prime Minister and colonial administrator 
 Hamani Diori (1916-1989), first President of the Republic of Niger
 Gabriel Lisette (1919-2001), Chadian statesman
 Yves de Daruvar (1921-2018), French administrator
 Pierre Alexandre (1922-1994), French anthropologist 
 Charles Assemekang (1926-), Congolese politician
 Cheikh Hamidou Kane (1928-), Senegalese writer
 Babacar Ba (1930-2006), Senegalese statesman
 Habib Thiam (1933-2017), Senegalese statesman
 Paul Biya (1933-), president of Cameroon
 Gervais Djondo (1934-), Togolese entrepreneur
 Abdou Diouf (1935-), second President of Senegal 
 Adamou Ndam Njoya (1942-2020), Cameroonian politician 
 Enrique Peñalosa (1954-), Mayor of Bogotá, Colombia
 Brahim Djamel Kassali (1954-) - Algerian Minister of Finance

See also
 Institut national des langues et civilisations orientales
 Archives nationales d'outre-mer

References 

Educational institutions established in 1889
Educational institutions disestablished in 2002
French colonial empire
French Third Republic
Education in Africa
Education in Paris
outre-mer
French West Africa
French Equatorial Africa
French public administration schools
1889 establishments in France